The 2022 NCAA Division I Indoor Track and Field Championships were the 57th NCAA Division I Men's Indoor Track and Field Championships and the 40th NCAA Division I Women's Indoor Track and Field Championships, held at the Birmingham CrossPlex in Birmingham, Alabama. In total, thirty-four different men's and women's indoor track and field events were contested from March 11 to March 12, 2022.

On the women's side, Florida took home the team title with 67 points, with Texas (56) and Kentucky (44) following in 2nd and 3rd. Texas won the men's title with 47 points, followed by North Carolina A&T with 36 points and Tennessee with 31.

Streaming and TV coverage
ESPN streamed the event on ESPN2, ESPN3, and ESPNU. On March 13, a replay of the championships was broadcast at 9:00 PM Eastern Time on ESPNU.

Results

Men's results

60 meters
Final results shown, not prelims

200 meters
Final results shown, not prelims

400 meters
Final results shown, not prelims

800 meters
Final results shown, not prelims

Mile
Final results shown, not prelims

3000 meters
Final results shown, not prelims

5000 meters
Final results shown, not prelims

60 meter hurdles
Final results shown, not prelims

4 x 400 meters relay
Final results shown, not prelims

Distance Medley Relay
Final results shown, not prelims

High Jump
Final results shown, not prelims

Pole Vault
Final results shown, not prelims

Long Jump
Final results shown, not prelims

Triple Jump
Final results shown, not prelims

Shot Put
Final results shown, not prelims

Weight Throw
Final results shown, not prelims

Heptathlon
Final results shown, not prelims

Men's team scores
Top 10 and ties shown

Women's results

60 meters
Final results shown, not prelims

200 meters
Final results shown, not prelims

400 meters
Final results shown, not prelims

800 meters
Final results shown, not prelims

Mile
Final results shown, not prelims

3000 meters
Final results shown, not prelims

5000 meters
Final results shown, not prelims

60 meter hurdles
Final results shown, not prelims

4 x 400 meters relay
Final results shown, not prelims

Distance Medley Relay
Final results shown, not prelims

High Jump
Final results shown, not prelims

Pole Vault
Final results shown, not prelims

Long Jump
Final results shown, not prelims

Triple Jump
Final results shown, not prelims

Shot Put
Final results shown, not prelims

Weight Throw
Final results shown, not prelims

Pentathlon
Final results shown, not prelims

Women's team scores
Top 10 and ties shown

Schedule

See also
National Collegiate Athletic Association (NCAA)
NCAA Men's Division I Indoor Track and Field Championships 
NCAA Women's Division I Indoor Track and Field Championships

References

External links
Results
Schedule

NCAA Division I Indoor Track and Field Championships
NCAA Indoor Track and Field Championships
NCAA Division I Indoor Track and Field Championships
NCAA Division I Indoor Track and Field Championships
College sports in Alabama
NCAA Division I Indoor Track and Field Championships